The Redesign is an album by American composer Bill Laswell, issued under the moniker Operazone. It was released on May 9, 2000 by Knitting Factory Records.

Track listing

Personnel 
Adapted from the liner notes of The Redesign.
Musicians
Karl Berger – keyboards, musical arrangements
Vincent Chancey – French horn
Hector Falcon – violin
Ralph Farris – viola, violin
Becky Friend – alto flute
Diva Goodfriend-Koven – alto flute, bass flute
Graham Haynes – cornet, flugelhorn
Mark Helias – double bass
Byard Lancaster – tenor saxophone
Denise Stillwell – viola, violin
Mark Taylor – French horn
Krystof Witek – violin
Garo Yellin – cello
Technical personnel
Alan Douglas – producer
Michael Fossenkemper – mastering
Bill Laswell – producer
Russell Mills – photography, design
Robert Musso – engineering

Release history

References

External links 
 The Redesign at Bandcamp
 

2000 albums
Bill Laswell albums
Albums produced by Alan Douglas (record producer)
Albums produced by Bill Laswell
Knitting Factory Records albums
Albums with cover art by Russell Mills (artist)